The tourism assets of Mozambique include the country's natural environment, wildlife, and cultural heritage, which provide opportunities for beach, cultural, and eco-tourism.

History
Despite its tourism assets and its nearness to South Africa, one of the world's top tourist destinations, Mozambique has the lowest tourist numbers of all its neighbours except Malawi. Tourism was a very profitable industry in the pre-independence period. Rhodesians and South Africans visited Beira and Mozambique's southern beaches. Gorongosa National Park, halfway between Zimbabwe and Beira was a large tourist attraction.

After independence from Portugal in 1975, the Mozambican Civil War that took place in the newly independent country between 1977 and 1992 decimated the tourism industry and wildlife conservation in Mozambique. Organized tourist travel in the country had ceased by 1978. The confidence of tourist operators has been growing since the end of civil conflict in the country, and the country now has the opportunity to revamp and further develop its tourist industry. Inadequate marketing budgets and a lack of tour operators limit the growth of the tourism industry.

By the end of the 1990s tourism was the fastest growing sector of Mozambique's economy. A Minister for Tourism was appointed in 1999. In 2003 tourism accounted for about 1.2% of the country's GDP, far below the Sub-Saharan average of 6.9%. In 2005 the tourist industry grew by 37%, the fastest tourist industry growth rate in the world. The industry attracts more foreign investment than any other part of the country's economy. Tourist arrivals in the country numbered 240,000 in 1999. UNWTO figures suggest approximately 578,000 tourists, an increase of 23% from 2004. Tourism receipts in 2001 were US$64 million and in 2005 were US$130 million. The sector employs 32,000 people. About one-third of the country's visitors are from South Africa.

There are about 7,700 hotel beds in the country, with an approximate occupancy rate of just below 40%. The capital Maputo has about half of the hotel nights. It is slow and expensive to access land for new hotel developments. Many tourist operators supply their own power. Air access is limited, with only one connection to Portugal other than regional services to Dar es Salaam, Harare, Johannesburg and Nairobi. Flight prices are high. Domestic air transport is very limited, although the price of fares is limited because of new small air carriers. The country's visa regulations are a problem for the tourist industry because many other countries near to it, such as Mauritius, Seychelles, and the Maldives, do not require European Union citizens to have visas.

The government hopes that the country's game and nature reserves will become a major tourist attraction. Despite game numbers being decimated during the wars there is positive growth in many of the nation's parks, especially the Maputo Special Reserve, and Gorongosa Parks.

Areas of interest

Cabo Delgado
 Pemba
 Quirimbas Islands
 Quirimbas National Park

Gaza
 Banhine National Park
 Limpopo National Park
 Xai-Xai

Inhambane
 Banhine National Park
 Bazaruto Archipelago
 Bazaruto National Park
 Inhambane
 Pomene National Reserve
 Tofo
 Vilankulo
 Zinave National Park

Manica
 Chimanimani National Reserve

Maputo
 Inhaca Island
 Maputo Protection Area
 Maputo Special Reserve

Niassa
 Niassa Reserve

Ponta do Ouro
 Ponta do Ouro

Sofala
 Gorongosa National Park
 Marromeu Buffalo Reserve

Vamizi
 Vamizi Island

Zambezia
 Gilé National Reserve

References

External links

 Idyllic Mozambique, One Of Africa's Rising Stars - slideshow at The Huffington Post

 
Mozambique